Theologos may refer to:
Theologos, Rhodes, a village on the Greek island of Rhodes
Theologos, Thasos, a village on the Greek island of Thasos